China Central Depository & Clearing Co., Ltd., in short CCDC or ChinaBond, is a central securities depository for Chinese government bonds, based in Beijing.

It was set up as China Securities Trading System Co., Ltd. in 1993 by People's Bank of China. It was reorganized into CCDC in 1996. It runs a national depository system of government bonds under the permission of Ministry of Finance of the People's Republic of China.

See also 
 ChinaClear

References 

Financial services companies established in 1996
Xicheng District
1996 establishments in China
Government-owned companies of China
Central securities depositories
Securities clearing and depository institutions